Amsacta flavicostata is a moth of the family Erebidae. It was described by Max Gaede in 1916. It is found in Cameroon and Togo.

References

Moths described in 1916
Spilosomina
Insects of Cameroon
Fauna of Togo
Moths of Africa